Sandstedt is a village and a former municipality in the district of Cuxhaven, in Lower Saxony, Germany. Since 1 January 2014, it is part of the municipality Hagen im Bremischen.

References

Former municipalities in Lower Saxony